Razak Abugiri (born 22 July 1988) is a Ghanaian judoka. He competed in the men's 60 kg event at the 2014 Commonwealth Games where he won a bronze medal.

References 

1988 births
Living people
Ghanaian male judoka
Commonwealth Games bronze medallists for Ghana
Judoka at the 2014 Commonwealth Games
Commonwealth Games medallists in judo
Medallists at the 2014 Commonwealth Games